Mbizo is a high density suburb in Kwekwe. It is located east of the city center across the railway line from ZIMASCO, the ferro-chrome producer. The suburb is divided into several sections all numbered one up to twenty. Mbizo Section One and Two form the oldest part of the suburb, which were originally built to house cheap labour for the gold mines in up town. 
Mbizo Stadium is located across from section one. Nearby, Manunure High School sprawls in a meadow across the street from Section Two.

Background 
The suburb, as is everything in Zimbabwe's main towns and cities, was formally a black only area, reserved for the poor and African population that streamed to the town in search of jobs. Together with Amaveni, Mbizo supplied the much needed labour to the gold mines scattered across the growing town. Since independence, the population of the suburb has exploded and the suburb itself has expanded from two sections numbered one and two, to eighteen. Most of these sections have extensions called 'one extension' and so forth.

In the news 
It is the hometown of Samukeliso Sithole, a teenager who won seven gold medals in women's athletics events in 2004. The following year, Sithole, who was considered to be a man impersonating a woman, was sentenced to jail for four years. Sithole was released early in December 2007. In 2014, Sithole's younger brother, Kelvin Sibanda, killed Sithole with a screwdriver during an argument. The murder occurred in Bulawayo, about 200 km southwest of Mbizo. Sibanda was sentenced to one year in jail and an additional two years of a suspended sentence.

Politics 
Like other townships in the working suburbs of cities across Zimbabwe, Mbizo has seen its share of political disturbances. Since 2000, when the Movement for Democratic Change (MDC) competed in elections, there has been sporadic political violence in many parts of the ward, from section 1 all to section 20. 
As in most acts of political violence, ZANU-PF militia units have been at the forefront of political violence in the township, and the police has stood by without arresting perpetrators of violence. Members of the MDC have been kidnapped, had their homes burnt and have been persecuted by the Zimbabwe Republic Police (ZRP) on many occasions. Reports of political violence in Mbizo have been reported in 2000, 2002, 2005, 2006, and 2008.

Sports 

Mbizo Stadium is a small stadium  and it is used for various activities, from hosting music concerts by popular artists like Alick Macheso, Simon Chimbetu to Tongai Moyo, a native of the town.  The stadium is located in Mbizo section one, the oldest part of the township. It has a capacity of about a thousand people.

Stampede 

On 21 November 2014, a stampede occurred at Mbizo Stadium killing 11 and injuring 40 people. Reuters reported that around 30,000 people attended a religious service officiated by Walter Magaya. After the service, a large portion of the crowd attempted to leave the stadium using one exit. Four people died instantly in the ensuring stampede while seven more were pronounced dead at a nearby hospital. The Business Standard reported that the stampede was caused by police firing teargas after some of the crowd attempted to break off parts of the stadium wall to exit.

See also 
Amaveni
Kwekwe

References 

Suburbs in Kwekwe